Kondavattanthidal is a village in the Thanjavur taluk of Thanjavur district, Tamil Nadu, India.

Demographics 

As per the 2001 census, Kondavattanthidal had a total population of 1210 with  599 males and  611 females. The sex ratio was 1020. The literacy rate was 81.72.

References 

Villages in Thanjavur district